Mentallo and the Fixer (sometimes written as Mentallo & the Fixer) is the project name used by Texan electro-industrial musicians Gary Dassing (Mentallo) and Dwayne Dassing (The Fixer) from 1988 to 1999, and by Gary Dassing alone from 1999 to the present day.  The band has several releases on the American record label, Metropolis Records. They are named after two Marvel Comics characters.

Biography
The Dassing brothers first began experimenting with music by the means of more traditional rock music instruments, such as guitar and drums. However, by the time the two formed their first band Benestrophe with vocalist Richard Mendez, the instruments of choice became synthesizers and samplers. Most of the two tapes worth of material they recorded subsequently became available as the releases Sensory Deprivation and Auric Fires on Ras Dva Records. 

After parting ways with Mendez, the two brothers began work as Mentallo & The Fixer. A friend of Gary's brought the name "Mentallo & The Fixer" to his attention while still working on Benestrophe. After Benestrophe went dormant, the name resurfaced and, after Gary realized the names referred to two lesser-known comic book characters, the name grew on him.

Their first album release No Rest for the Wicked saw a limited 500-copy run on vinyl and a CD by the Portuguese label Simbiose records, and also gained the attention of Talla 2XLC from Zoth Ommog records. Zoth Ommog released their next two major albums, Revelations 23 and Where Angels Fear to Tread. As an American band, working with European labels proved difficult and frustrating due to poor communications and, in the case of the Simbiose releases, a lack of a formal contract.

Mentallo & The Fixer soon after began their long-term relationship with the American industrial music record label Metropolis Records with a domestic re-release of their second and third albums as well as a CD of unreleased back catalog material, Continuum.

Meanwhile, in 1994, the Dassing brothers formed a side project with vocalist Michael Greene called Mainesthai. Mainesthai's two releases, Out to Lunch and Mentallo & The Fixer Meets Mainesthai were also both released on Metropolis Records, but not until 1998. Michael also participated in Mentallo's first U.S. tour in 1996, joining the band to perform Mainesthai tracks during their live sets.

In 1997 Mentallo & The Fixer toured the U.S. for the second time, Europe for the first time, and released their next album Burnt Beyond Recognition, along with two EPs, Centuries and False Prophets. The band's second US tour was initially cut short due to difficulties because of the long duration and because show revenue was unexpectedly low, but the missed tour dates were rescheduled after a break. The European tour in October that year proved to be a much better experience for the band.

By 1999, Dwayne and Gary agreed to split in order to pursue their own musical directions. After the departure of Dwayne from the band (aside from some live show support through 2002), Gary continued to use the Mentallo & The Fixer name and released several albums including Algorythum, Love Is the Law, Return to Grimpen Ward, and Vengeance is Mine, along with the EP Systematik Ruin to accompany Alogrythum.

After "Grimpen", Mentallo's album output slowed somewhat, resulting in two albums: Enlightenment Through a Chemical Catalyst in 2007 and Music From the Eather in 2012, both released by Alfa Matrix.

In September 2014, Mentallo & the Fixer released a 3 CD box titled Zothera on Alfa Matrix. It contained two remastered albums from their Zoth Ommog era, namely Revelations 23 and Where Angels Fear to Tread, and a third bonus CD Apocrypha with unreleased material including remixes.

Another intervening period of dormancy followed, compelled by the crash of Gary's music computer, which he took as a sign to give music a break for a while. After a several year break and a new Apple computer, Gary found the motivation to revive works in progress from data backups and record a new album, Arrange The Molecule, released by Alfa Matrix in 2017.

Updates posted to the band's official Facebook page in 2019 showed Gary in the studio, joined by brother Dwayne and occasional collaborator Jon (Jonni) Pyre, working on new material for an as yet unnamed project. The apparent inspiration for this live performance-only project is Tangerine Dream's first live recording from 1975, Ricochet.

Discography

Main discography
Studio albums
 .5 Honkey/Wreckage + Ruin + & + Regrets + (Redemption) (1991, GPC Productions)
 No Rest for the Wicked (1992, Simbiose)
 Revelations 23 (1993, Zoth Ommog)
 Where Angels Fear to Tread (1994, Zoth Ommog)
 Burnt Beyond Recognition (1997, Metropolis)
 Algorythum (1999, Metropolis)
 Love Is the Law (2000, Metropolis)
 Vengeance Is Mine (2001, Metropolis)
 Enlightenment Through a Chemical Catalyst (2007, Metropolis)
 Music From the Eather (2012, Alfa Matrix)
 Arrange the Molecule (2017, Alfa Matrix)

Remix albums
 Mentallo & The Fixer Meets Mainesthai (1994, Zoth Ommog)
 Continuum (1995, Metropolis)
 Return to Grimpen Ward (2001, Metropolis)

Extended plays
 Centuries (1997, Metropolis)
 False Prophets (1997, Metropolis)
 Systematik Ruin (1999, Metropolis)
 Commandments for the Molecular Age (2006, Alfa Matrix)
 4.4U (2012.11) (2012, Alfa Matrix)

Compilation albums
 ...There's No Air to Breathe (1997, Zoth Ommog)
 A Collection of Rare, Unreleased & Remastered (2012, Alfa Matrix)
 Zothera (2014, Alfa Matrix)

Compilation appearances
 Cybernetic Biodread Transmission – LP side B track #1/CD track #5 "Brutal Rapture" (1992) Simbiose
 The Cyberflesh Conspiracy – CD track #2 (1992) If It Moves...
 We Came To Dance - Indie Dancefloor Vol. II" – CD track #11 "Decomposed" (1993) Sub Terranean
 Zoth in Your Mind – CD track #1 "Sacrilege (Angel of Death Mix)" (1993) Zoth Ommog
 Moonraker – 2xCD disc #1 track #3 "Grim Reality" (1994) Sub Terranean
 The Colours of Zoth Ommog – CD track #2 "Grim Reality (Grimpen Ward Remix)" (1994) Zoth Ommog
 Totentanz - The Best of Zoth Ommog – 2xCD disc #2 track #1 "Sacrilege (Angel of Death Mix)" and track #2 "Rapid Suffocation" (1994) Zoth Ommog
 We Came to Dance Vol. V – CD track #6 "Legion of Lepers (Grimpen Ward Remix)" (1994) Sub Terranean
 Electricity Vol. 6 – CD track #4 "Battered States of Euphoria" (1995) Ausfahrt
 Moonraker Vol. II – 2xCD disc #2 track #3 "Sacrilege (Grimpen Ward Mix)" (1995) Sub Terranean
 The Tyranny Off the Beat Vol. II – CD track #11 "Murderers Among Us (B.K. Mix)" (1995) Off Beat
 There Is No Time – 4xCD disc #1 track #2 "Decomposed (Grimpen Ward Mix)" (1995) Ras Dva
 The Tyranny Off the Beat Vol. III – CD track #6 "Peril" (1996) Off Beat
 Neurostyle Vol. III – CD track #2 "Goliath" (1997) Sub Terranean
 Reticence – CS side B track #6 "Psylocybin" (1997) SDS Productions
 Something For Your Mind – CD track #1 "Legion of Lepers (Grimpen Ward Remix)" (1997) Zoth Ommog
 The Tyranny Off the Beat Vol. IV – 2xCD disc #1 track #2 "Goliath" (1997) Off Beat
 Apocalypse Now Vol. 2 – 2xCD disc #1 track #14 "Brutal Rupture (Re-Mix)" (1998) Sub Terranean
 Electronic Lust V.1 – 2xCD disc #1 track #10 "Narcosis" (1998) Orkus
 Electropolis: Volume 1 – CD track #5 "Vision" (1998) Metropolis
 The Tyranny Off the Beat Vol. V – 2xCD disc #2 track #3 "Mother of Harlots (Tempo Chrusher)" (1998) Off Beat
 Metropolis 1999 – CD track #14 "Scum of the Earth" (1999) Metropolis
 Music Research Promotional CD MIDEM '99 Alternative – 2xCD disc #1 track #4 "When Worlds Collide" (1999) Music Research
 The Complete History of Zoth Ommog: Totentanz – 4xCD disc #2 track #1 "Sacrilege (Angel of Death Mix)" and track #2 "Rapid Suffocation" (1999) Cleopatra
 Electropolis: Volume 2 – CD track #2 "Murderers Among Us (Exclusive Mix)" (2000) Metropolis
 Music Research/Alternative – CD track #4 "When Worlds Collide" (2000) Zoth Ommog
 A Tribute to the Prodigy – CD track #8 "Jericho" (2002) Hypnotic/Anagram Records
 Your Future Is My Past – CD track #12 "Goliath (Remix)" (2004) Machinist Records
 Electro/R/Evolution Volume 1 – CD track #4 "Signaljammer (Unreleased Demo)" (2005) Static Sky Records
 Endzeit Bunkertracks [Act II] – 4xCD Ltd. Edition Box Set disc #2 track #6 "Driving Off a Cliff With a Cult (An Old Friend Nearly Killed Me Mix)" (2006) Alfa Matrix
 Matri-X-Trax (Chapter 2) – CD Promo track #7 "Brute Force Uploading (Mescalero Radio Edit)", track #8 "Opening The Bandwidth for the Cosmic Signal (AM Frequencies Radio Edit)", and track #9 "Brief But Violent Illness (Radio Blackout Re-edit)" (2006) Alfa Matrix
 Mew Signs & Sounds 07-08/06 – CD Enhanced track #7 "Brute Force Uploading (Mescalero Radio Edit)" (2006) Zillo
 Re:Connected [2.0] – 2xCD Box Set disc #2 track #2 "Brute Force Uploading (Mescalero Radio Edit)" (2006) Alfa Matrix
 Sonic Seducer Cold Hands Seduction Vol. 63 – CD + CD Enhanced disc #2 track #11 "Brute Force Uploading (Mescalero Radio Edit)" (2006) Sonic Seducer
 Sounds from the Matrix 003 – CD Promo track #1 "Signaljammer" (2006) Alfa Matrix
 Sounds from the Matrix 004 – CD Promo track #16 "First Flower After The Flood (Trichocereus Mix)" (2006) Alfa Matrix
 Sonic Seducer Cold Hands Seduction Vol. 67 – CD + CD Enhanced disc #1 track #2 "Outside The Pharmacies of Fairyland (Short Cut)" (2007) Sonic Seducer
 Sounds from the Matrix 05 – CD Promo track #15 "First Flower After the Flood (Short-Cut Edit)" (2007) Alfa Matrix
 The Giant Minutes to the Dawn – 3xCD + DVD Box Set disc #3 track #15 "First Flower After the Flood (Short-Cut Edit)" Alfa Matrix

Side projects

Benestrophe
Benestrophe began after Gary Dassing and Rich Mendez met in their senior year of high school in San Antonio, TX. Their first song - "Pig Butcher" - was recorded in the Summer of 1988. Gary and Dwayne composed the music and Rich wrote the lyrics and provided vocals. Benestrophe went idle in 1990 as the Dassing brothers moved to Austin, TX, but reactivated for a time after 1995 with new material and re-releases on RAS DVA records.

 Sensory Deprivation – Cassette, Self-released
 Red Kross – Cassette (1990) Self-released
 Sensory Deprivation – CD Ltd. Edition (1994) Ras Dva
 Auric Fires – CD (1997) Ras Dva
 CD Sound Compilation Vol. 1 – V/A CD track #14 "Sensory Deprivation" (1994) IndustrialnatioN Magazine
 There Is No Time – V/A 4xCD disc #2 track #1 "Shall Not Want (Unreleased Track)" (1995) Ras Dva
 Dora Blue - The Ras Dva Fanbase Compilation – CD track #8 "Dog Lab (An Early Morning Remix), track #10 "D.C.O.", track #12 "Sleep Tonight (Remix)" (1996) Ras Dva
 Awake the Machines - On the Line Vol. 2 – 2xCD disc #1 track #6 "Lesser of 2 Evils" (1997) Out of Line/Sub/Mission Records
 Binary Application Extension 04 – CD track #15 "Sister Mary's Sleep" (1997) Genocide Project
 Turner's All Night Drugstore (Rare & Unreleased 1987-1997) – DL (2018)

Mainesthai
Mainesthai was a short-term collaboration between the Dassing brothers and Mike Greene. Gary answered an ad that Mike had put in a local paper which led to an interview and one-song demo performance that led to a formal collaboration. As was the case with Benestrophe, Gary and Dwayne produced the music and Mike contributed the lyrics and vocals. Mainesthai's sound was similar to Mentallo, but the subject matter was explicitly more political in nature and the music was made with an effort to sound more melodic and, in their words, "tribal".

 Out to Lunch - CD (1994) Zoth Ommog Records
 Mentallo & The Fixer Meets Mainesthai – CD (1994) Zoth Ommog Records • CD (1998) Metropolis Records
 Body Rapture Vol. 4 – V/A CD track #2 "Dollars and Sins" (1994) Zoth Ommog Records
 We Came to Dance - Indie Dancefloor Vol. VI – V/A CD track #10 "Exit (Stage Left)" (1994) Sub Terranean
 There Is No Time – V/A 4xCD disc #2 track #9 "Y (Mama's Crazy Kitchen Mix)" (1995) Ras Dva

Parking Lot in Drug Form
This is a Gary Dassing and Ric Laciak project recorded while Ric stayed with Gary during a two-week visit to Austin, TX.

 There Is No Time – V/A 4xCD disc #4 track #15 "Step Away" (1995) Ras Dva
 AP: The Contest – V/A CD track #14 "So Cold" (1995) Zoth Ommog Records

Shimri
Gary Dassing solo project.
 Lilies of the Field – CD (2000) Artoffact Records

Reign of Roses
Dwayne Dassing with vocals and lyrics by Scott Berens Drum programming on some tracks by Gary Dassing
 In Bourbon and in Blood – CDr (2006) Self-released

Kitty Kosmonaut
Dwayne Dassing with John Bustamante of Fektion Fekler
 Kitty Kosmonaut - CD, Digital (2015) Re:Mission Entertainment

References

External links
 Mentallo & The Fixer's Metropolis Records Page
 
 
 
 

Musical groups established in 1988
1988 establishments in Texas
American electro-industrial music groups
Musical groups from San Antonio
Metropolis Records artists
Zoth Ommog Records artists
Off Beat label artists
Sibling musical duos